Melothria scabra, commonly known as the cucamelon, Mexican miniature watermelon, Mexican sour cucumber, Mexican sour gherkin, mouse melon, or pepquinos, is a species of flowering plant in the cucurbit family grown for its edible fruit. Its native range spans Mexico to Venezuela. Fruits are about the size of grapes and taste like cucumbers with a tinge of sourness. It may have been eaten by indigenous peoples before European colonization of the Americas began.

Description

Melothria scabra is a vine similar in morphology to Melothria pendula. It is fast growing: germination under favourable conditions takes approximately 10 days, with plants reaching maturity in approximately 60–75 days. It is a perennial species, but as it is not frost hardy it is often grown as an annual. The leaf margin is undulate or dentate, the apex is caudate, and the leaf base is cordate. The leaf surface is scabrous; the upper surface is covered with small hairs called trichomes. Similar to some types of cucumber, these plants are monoecious, producing both male (staminate) and female (pistillate) flowers on the same plant. Unusually for the cucurbits, the female flowers appear before the male flowers. These plants can pollinate themselves, but the individual flowers are not self-fertile. Each plant can produce hundreds of fruits, which develop at the base of the female flowers (the ovaries are inferior). In contrast to the fruits of most other wild species in the cucurbit family, the fruit of Melothria scabra has a sweet rather than bitter flesh. Plants are drought resistant and pest-resistant relative to other cucumbers.

Etymology

Binomial name 
The genus name  is from Ancient Greek μηλοθρων: mēlothrōn 'kind of white grape' in reference to small grapevine fruits born by the genus. The specific epithet  is Latin for 'rough, scabby'.

Common names 
The English language common name 'cucamelon' arose in the 1980s; it is a portmanteau of 'cucumber' and 'melon'. The Spanish language common name '' translates as 'little watermelon'; its etymology is  'watermelon' + ita, a suffix used to indicate something is small.

Distribution and habitat 
Melothria scabra is native to Colombia, El Salvador, Guatemala, Honduras, Mexico, Nicaragua, Panama, and Venezuela, where it grows in forests and thickets.

Diseases 
Melothria scabra is susceptible to infection by Pseudoperonospora cubensis, a plant pathogen that causes cucurbit downy mildew. It is also susceptible to infection by another plant pathogen, Podosphaera xanthii, which causes powdery mildew. Plants are reported to be susceptible to infection by Cucumber mosaic virus.

Cultivation 
Melothria scabra is cultivated as a minor crop for its fruits, which are eaten raw or pickled.

Notes

References

External links 
 Article from Mother Earth News
 Article from Bihrmann's Caudiciforms

Cucurbitoideae
Fruit vegetables
Taxa named by Charles Victor Naudin
Flora of Central America
Flora of Mexico
Plants described in 1866